Dream West is a 1986 American television miniseries starring Richard Chamberlain and directed by Dick Lowry.

Development
The seven-hour miniseries was broken into three parts (2 hours, 2 hours, and 3 hours).  Part 1 aired on Sunday, April 13, 1986.  It was the 16th most-watched show of that week.  Part 2 had been intended to follow the next day, but was postponed a day until April 15 due to a press conference by President Ronald Reagan about Libya (see 1986 United States bombing of Libya). Part 3 was moved to Sunday, April 20.  Part 2 was the 15th most watched television show for its week, and Part 3 came in 8th place.

Plot
The film was based on the 1984 novel of the same name by David Nevin, based on the life of 19th century explorer and politician John C. Frémont.

Cast

 Richard Chamberlain as John Charles Fremont
 Alice Krige as Jessie Benton Fremont
 F. Murray Abraham as President Abraham Lincoln
 René Enríquez as General Castro
 Ben Johnson as Jim Bridger
 Jerry Orbach as Capt. John Sutter
 G. D. Spradlin as General Steven Watts Kearney
 Rip Torn as Kit Carson
 Fritz Weaver as Senator Thomas Hart Benton
 Anthony Zerbe as Bill Williams
 Claude Akins as Tom Fitzpatrick
 John Anderson as Brig. Gen. Brooke
 Lee Bergere as 'Papa Joe' Nicollet
 Jeff East as Tim Donovan
 Michael Ensign as Karl Preuss
 Mel Ferrer as Judge Elkins
 Gayle Hunnicutt as Mrs. Maria Crittenden

Reception
The Encyclopedia of Television Film Directors (2009) refers to the film as a "bracing yet relatively little remembered miniseries."

The film was released on DVD as part of the Warner Archive Collection in 2012.

References

External links

1980s American television miniseries
Films based on American novels
American television films
1986 television films
1986 films
Films directed by Dick Lowry
Films scored by Fred Karlin
Depictions of Abraham Lincoln on film
Cultural depictions of Kit Carson
Films with screenplays by Evan Hunter